Jon C. Sesso (born November 15, 1953) is an American politician of the Democratic Party. He was the Minority Leader of the Montana Senate, representing District 37 from 2013 to 2018. He was previously a member of the Montana House of Representatives, representing District 76, from 2004 to 2013.

Life and career before politics
Jon Sesso was born on November 15, 1953 in Racine, Wisconsin. In 1971, Sesso attended the University of Wisconsin Madison and obtained a bachelor's degree in Communications and a master's degree in Communications and Environmental Studies.

Political career
Since 1991, Sesso has been the Director of the Planning Department in the county of Silver Bow. He is heavily involved with Superfund activities, particularly in regards to the Berkeley Pit.

In 2004, Jon Sesso was elected to the Montana House of Representatives for the state's 76th District. Sesso served on the House Appropriations Committee during his tenure. During the 2011-2012 legislative session, Sesso served as the Minority Leader of the Montana House of Representatives for the Democratic Party.

Sesso was elected to the Montana Senate in 2013 and succeeded Carol Williams as the Minority Leader of the Senate.

References

External links
Montana Senate - Jon Sesso official MT State Legislature website
Project Vote Smart – Representative Jon C. Sesso (MT) profile
Ballotpedia - Jon Sesso profile
Follow the Money – Jon C Sesso
2008 2006 2004 campaign contributions

1953 births
21st-century American politicians
Living people
Members of the Montana House of Representatives
Montana state senators
Politicians from Butte, Montana
Politicians from Racine, Wisconsin
University of Wisconsin–Madison School of Journalism & Mass Communication alumni